Maria del Rosio "Rosie" Alfaro (born October 12, 1971) is an American woman convicted of the 1990 murder of 9-year-old Autumn Wallace in Anaheim, California. She is currently on California's death row.

Early life
Alfaro was raised in Anaheim, California.  She became a drug addict at 13, a prostitute at 14, a single mother at 15, mother to four children and murderer at 18. She has the notoriety of being the first woman in Orange County, California to receive the death penalty at 20.

Murder of Autumn Wallace
On June 15, 1990, Autumn Wallace (born January 15, 1981), age nine, was home by herself in Anaheim, California; she was waiting for her older sister and mother to return home from work. Alfaro knew the Wallace family very well and was friendly with one of the older daughters. She thought that they were out, and that she would be able to steal items from the home to sell in order to purchase drugs. 

Autumn opened the door for Alfaro, her sister's friend, who asked to use the bathroom. Alfaro took a knife from the kitchen before proceeding to the bathroom, located at the back of the house. She then coaxed Autumn into the bathroom on a ruse, and stabbed her 50 times. Alfaro then raided the house for something to steal, supposedly to acquire drug money. The stolen property was later sold for $240.

Alfaro confessed to the crime during a police-taped interview, stating she was high on heroin and cocaine (never proven since she was not arrested and drug tested within the 36 to 48 hours of the murder) when she stabbed Autumn. Later she changed her story and alleged an unidentified man forced her to stab the little girl. Still later, Alfaro told police that two men drove her to the Wallace home, and one of the men entered the house and forced her to kill Autumn. She refused to identify the man. The evidence from the crime scene only indicated that members of the Wallace family and Alfaro (based on her fingerprints and a matched bloodstained shoe print) were present in the home that day.

Sentencing
She was tried and convicted of first-degree murder with special circumstances. At the end of the penalty phase of the trial, the jury deadlocked 10-2 on the sentence of death. The penalty phase of the trial was then declared a mistrial. A second jury returned a verdict of death. The trial judge upheld the jury's verdict and sentenced Alfaro to death.

Alfaro was the first woman sentenced to death in the gas chamber, and at the time of sentencing was the third woman on death row in California.

In August 2007, the California Supreme Court voted unanimously to uphold Alfaro's death sentence.

See also
 List of death row inmates in the United States
 List of women on death row in the United States

References

1971 births
Living people
1990 murders in the United States
American female murderers
American murderers of children
American prisoners sentenced to death
Criminals from California
Prisoners sentenced to death by California
People from Anaheim, California
American people convicted of murder
People convicted of murder by California
Women sentenced to death
20th-century American criminals